Pecan Plantation is an unincorporated community and census-designated place (CDP) in southeast Hood County, Texas, United States. Its population was 5,294 at the 2010 census, up from 3,544 at the 2000 census. It is part of the Granbury, Texas, micropolitan statistical area.

Geography
Pecan Plantation is located in southeastern Hood County at  (32.361996, -97.663991). A small portion of the CDP extends east into Johnson County. The CDP occupies De Cordova Bend on the west side of the Brazos River, downstream from Lake Granbury. The dam for the reservoir impounds the Brazos at the northwest corner of the CDP.

History
Pecan Plantation features a  development that evolved around a two-runway cropdusting airstrip. The development retained the runways, allowing airpark homes with access to the runways.

Demographics

2020 census

As of the 2020 United States census, there were 6,236 people, 2,684 households, and 2,151 families residing in the CDP.

2000 census
As of the census of 2000, 3,544 people, 1,475 households, and 1,299 families were residing in the CDP. The population density was 506.8 people per square mile (195.8/km2). There were 1,568 housing units at an average density of 224.2/sq mi (86.6/km2). The racial makeup of the CDP was 98.11% White, 0.17% African American, 0.25% Native American, 0.48% Asian or Pacific Islander, 0.28% from other races, and 0.71% from two or more races. Hispanics or Latinos of any race were 2.43% of the population.

Of the 1,475 households,22.4% had children under 18 living with them, 84.7% were married couples living together, 2.6% had a female householder with no husband present, and 11.9% were not families. About 10.4% of all households were made up of individuals, and 6.2% had someone living alone who was 65 years of age or older. The average household size was 2.40 and the average family size was 2.55.

In the CDP, th age distribution was 18.2% under 18, 2.3% from 18 to 24, 17.7% from 25 to 44, 36.0% from 45 to 64, and 25.8% who were 65  or older. The median age was 53 years. For every 100 females, there were 95.6 males. For every 100 females age 18 and over, there were 95.3 males.

The median income for a household in the CDP was $75,145, and for a family was $77,752. Males had a median income of $68,036 versus $37,188 for females. The per capita income for the CDP was $38,968. About 1.1% of families and 2.4% of the population were below the poverty line, including 7.7% of those under age 18 and none of those 65 or over.

Education
Pecan Plantation is served by the Granbury Independent School District.

References

Granbury micropolitan area
Census-designated places in Hood County, Texas
Census-designated places in Texas